Ivaylo Dimitrov (born 26 March 1989) is a Bulgarian professional footballer who plays as a winger or forward for Lokomotiv Plovdiv. Dimitrov was educated in CSKA Sofia's youth academy.

Career
On 23 July 2018, Dimitrov signed with Armenian club FC Ararat-Armenia for two years.

Career statistics

Club

1. ^ Includes other competitive competitions, including the Bulgarian Supercup.

International

International career
On 21 August 2017, Dimitrov was selected for the first time to the Bulgaria senior team by manager Petar Hubchev ahead of 2018 FIFA World Cup qualifiers against Sweden and Netherlands. He made his debut ten days later against Sweden as an 83rd-minute substitute for Ivelin Popov in a 3–2 win.

Honours
CSKA Sofia
 Bulgarian League (1): 2007–08

Slavia Sofia
 Bulgarian Cup (1): 2017–18

References

External links
 
 Player Profile at National-Football-Teams

1989 births
Living people
Footballers from Sofia
Bulgarian footballers
Bulgaria international footballers
PFC CSKA Sofia players
FC Sportist Svoge players
Akademik Sofia players
PFC Svetkavitsa players
FC Etar 1924 Veliko Tarnovo players
PFC Nesebar players
PFC Dobrudzha Dobrich players
PFC Slavia Sofia players
FC Ararat-Armenia players
FC Zhetysu players
FC Arda Kardzhali players
SFC Etar Veliko Tarnovo players
First Professional Football League (Bulgaria) players
Second Professional Football League (Bulgaria) players
Armenian Premier League players
Bulgarian expatriate footballers
Bulgarian expatriate sportspeople in Armenia
Expatriate footballers in Armenia
Bulgarian expatriate sportspeople in Kazakhstan
Expatriate footballers in Kazakhstan
Association football forwards